The Olusegun Obasanjo Presidential Library is a library owned by Chief Olusegun Obasanjo, a former President of Nigeria. It is a historic, tourist and academic centre established as a national archive for the preservation of documents and materials used by the president during his tenure as the president of Nigeria. The library is located at Oke Mosan Abeokuta, Ogun State in Nigeria.

History

The library is a resemblance of the presidential library system from the United States. The concept of Presidential Library started in 1939 by President Franklin D. Roosevelt of America who donated his official documents for national use. The country passed into law in 1955, the Presidential Libraries Act to formalize this project for national archive of all American Presidential documents and materials in office.

The Olusegun Obasanjo Presidential Library was conceived in 1988 to immortalize him and it was actualized after he became the president of the Federal Republic of Nigeria. The idea to establish the Olusegun Obasanjo Presidential Library remained just an idea until 10 years later when Chief Olusegun Obasanjo rose from prison to the State House as Nigeria’s second elected Executive President. He soon established the Office of Presidential Libraries (Libraries, Research and Documentation) with a stated mission to see the OOPL idea translated into reality.

On November 12, 2002, the Olusegun Obasanjo Presidential Library Foundation was incorporated as a not-profit organisation to advise, promote and encourage the establishment, growth and development of the Library, to coordinate its activities and provide support for its programmes. The Foundation’s Board of Trustees was charged with mobilising private sector interest and funding to construct, furnish, maintain, and protect the Library complex’s buildings and its holdings.

Facilities
The Presidential Library complex comprises 32 hectares. The archives proper house 15 million documents, two million books and 4,000 artifacts relating to Obasanjo's two stints in power, and contemporary Nigerian and African history more generally. The complex also includes an open air amphitheater, a 1000-seat auditorium, a 153-room hotel, several restaurants and bars, a small amusement park, a wildlife park, and an observation point.

Structure 
The presidential library complex is strategically located at the intersection of two major roads that lead into the city of Abeokuta from two different directions, namely, The Presidential Boulevard and The MKO Abiola Way. The first leads to Lagos, and the second leads to Ibadan. The complex’s 32 hectares lie in the immediate vicinity of the Federal High Court, the City Stadium, the Federal and State Governments’ Secretariats, a golf course and several high-brow residential estates.

The construction of the complex presented a lot of environmental and physical challenges because of the site’s unique topographical formation. Almost 47 per cent of the site is covered with outcrops of igneous granite rock formation.

The shape and outlook of the rock formations are impressive and interesting. A plateau-like formation serves as a natural helipad. Others form hillocks that create an excellent view of the entire complex and major areas of the surrounding cityscape. The site is not all rock. A swift stream empties into a small swamp and was dammed to provide water and electricity. The dam is one of the highlights of any visit to the library complex.

References

External links
 Official website
 Obasanjo Foundation on Facebook

Public libraries in Nigeria
Obasanjo family
Tourist attractions in Abeokuta
Ogun State